The 2011 Pacific Games women's rugby sevens tournament was held in New Caledonia from 31 August to 2 September 2011 in Nouméa. This was the inaugural rugby sevens tournament for women at the Pacific Games. Fiji won the gold medal defeating Samoa by 43–7in the final. Papua New Guinea took the bronze defeating New Caledonia by 19–5 in the third place match.

Participants
Seven teams played in the tournament:

Format
The teams played a round-robin followed by play-offs for the medals and fifth place.

Preliminary round

Day 1

Day2

Knockout stage

5th–7th play-offs

Seventh place knockout

Fifth place

Medal play-offs

Third place

Final

See also
Men's Rugby sevens at the 2011 Pacific Games
Rugby sevens at the Pacific Games
Pacific Games

References

Rugby sevens at the 2011 Pacific Games